Prądnik bread (Polish: Chleb prądnicki) - is a traditional secale bread baked in Kraków. The bread may be produced in huge loaves amounting to 14 kg. It is a protected produce, under geographical indications and traditional specialities in the European Union. 

Prądnik bread was produced in villages located on the banks of the Prądnik River - in Prądnik Czerwony and Prądnik Biały, from the fourteenth-century. Formerly, the river's upper course gravitational potential energy was harvested for the use of watermills for milling flour. The oldest document to mention Prądnik bread originates from 1421, when the Bishop of Kraków, Albert gave his cook two domains (źreb) of land by the Prądnik River and tasks him with baking bread for the bishopric. 

By royal prerogative, on May 26, 1496, King John I Albert gave the bakers on the River Prądnik (among others) the right to sell bread in Kraków once a week, during the market occurring on Tuesdays. Bakers outside of Kraków had limitations on their sale and production of bread, having only received full commercial rights in 1785.

References

Polish cuisine
Kraków
Lesser Poland
Polish products with protected designation of origin